Ultime lettere di Jacopo Ortis (The Last Letters of Jacopo Ortis) is an epistolary novel written by Ugo Foscolo between 1798 and 1802 and first published later that year. A second edition, with major changes, was published by Foscolo in Zurich (1816) and a third one in London (1817).

The model was Goethe's novel The Sorrows of Young Werther (1774). Another influence is Rousseau's Julie, or the New Heloise (1761). Foscolo's work was also inspired by the political events that occurred in Northern Italy during the Napoleonic period, when the Fall of the Republic of Venice and the subsequent Treaty of Campoformio forced Foscolo to go into exile from Venice to Milan. The autobiographic elements reflect into the novel.

Ortis is composed of letters written by Jacopo to his friend Lorenzo Alderani; the last chapter is the description of the young man's last hours and suicide written by Lorenzo.

The plot is located in the countryside near Padua and takes place between October 1797 and March 1799. Jacopo Ortis is a patriot who must retreat in a village in Colli Euganei to escape political persecutions. Here he meets a girl, named Teresa, and her family. The two youths fall in love, but this love is impossible, since the girl is fiancée to Odoardo, and Jacopo is in no condition to offer her a marriage.

In despair, Jacopo travels through Italy (then divided into various little states) and visits many cities, among them Florence, with the historical tombs of Santa Croce, Milan, where he meets Giuseppe Parini, Genoa, Ventimiglia. After a deep meditation about nature, history and human fate, he resolves to go back to Veneto. He visits Teresa, then his mother. Finally he commits suicide.

Sources
 Ugo Foscolo, Opere, Ricciardi Editore, Milano-Napoli, 1974
  Giulio Ferroni, Profilo storico della letteratura italiana, Einaudi Scuola, Milano, 1992

1802 novels
1816 novels
Italian historical novels
Epistolary novels
Sentimental novels
Novels set in the 1790s
Padua
19th-century Italian novels